Wafe Messaoud (born 24 October 1994) is a Tunisian footballer, who plays as a centre back for Bağcılat Evren Spor in the Turkish Women'sFirstr League[ and the Tunisia women's national team.

Club career 
Messaoud has played for Gafsa in Tunisia.

In December 2022, she moved to Turkey and joined Fatih Vatan Spor in Istanbul to play in the 2021–22 Women's Super League. She appeared in 16 matches of the 2021–22 season. The next seaso, she transferred to Kireçburnu Spor. In the sond half of the 2022–23 season, she changed her club to Bağcılar Evren Spor in the Turkish first legue

International career 
Messaoud has capped for Tunisia at senior level, including two friendly away wins over Jordan in June 2021.

International goals
Scores and results list Tunisia's goal tally first

See also 
List of Tunisia women's international footballers

References

External links

1994 births
Living people
Tunisian women's footballers
Women's association football central defenders
Tunisia women's international footballers
Tunisian expatriate footballers
Tunisian expatriate sportspeople in Turkey
Expatriate women's footballers in Turkey
Turkish Women's Football Super League players
Fatih Vatan Spor players
Kireçburnu Spor players